Billy-Montigny is a commune in the Pas-de-Calais department in the Hauts-de-France region in northern France.

Geography
The coal lasted just over 100 years, the last pits closing in the 1960s.

Population

Sights
 The church of St. Martin, dating from the nineteenth century.
 The Commonwealth War Graves Commission cemetery.

History
The history of the area remains marked by the Courrières mine disaster which resulted in 1,099 casualties on 10 March 1906 in the area of the communes of Billy-Montigny, Méricourt and Sallaumines.

Personalities
Georges Lech and Bernard Lech, footballers.

International relations
The commune is twinned with:
  Trzebinia, Poland
  Reggello, Italy
  Bonen, Germany

See also
Communes of the Pas-de-Calais department

References

External links

 Official town website 
 The CWGC graves in the commune cemetery

Communes of Pas-de-Calais
Artois